The 2004–05 SK Rapid Wien season is the 107th season in club history.

Squad statistics

Goal scorers

Fixtures and results

Bundesliga

League table

Cup

UEFA Cup

References

Notes

2004-05 Rapid Wien Season
Austrian football clubs 2004–05 season
Austrian football championship-winning seasons